= Court Up North =

Two-part documentary film

- Presented by: Danielle Parry
- Country of origin: Australia
- Original language: English
- No. of episodes: 2

Production
- Running time: 28 minutes

Original release
- Network: ABC1
- Release: 13 October 2013

Court Up North is a two-part documentary by the ABC. The documentary explores the issues surrounding the criminal law system in the Northern Territory, particularly in relation to remote communities and Indigenous Australians.
